100.1 Hope Radio (DXDB 100.1 MHz) is an FM station owned and operated by Adventist Media. Its studios and transmitter are located at Miguel Sheker Ave., Iligan.

References

External links
Hope Radio Iligan FB Page
Hope Radio Iligan Website

Radio stations in Iligan
Radio stations established in 2012
Christian radio stations in the Philippines